The 2019 WNBA season was the 12th season for the Atlanta Dream of the Women's National Basketball Association. The team began its season on May 24, 2019 against the Dallas Wings and concluded the season on September 8 against the New York Liberty.

On December 13, 2018 the Atlanta Dream announced that they would return to State Farm Arena, formerly Philips Arena, after playing the previous two seasons at Georgia Tech's McCamish Pavilion while State Farm Arena underwent a $192.5 million renovation.

The Dream endured a season without star Angel McCoughtry, who missed time with a knee ligament injury sustained in 2018.  The Dream started slowly only winning 2 games of their first ten.  Early July brought some hope to the team, with the Dream winning three of four games between July 5 and July 12.  However, the streak would not continue as the Dream lost twelve games in a row from July 14 to August 20.  The Dream won three of their last 7 games to finish with an 8–26 record, last in the WNBA.  It was the Dream's second worst season in franchise history.  For the first time in franchise history, the Dream did not have a player selected to the All-Star Game.

Transactions

WNBA Draft

Trades and Roster Changes

Roster
{| class="toccolours" style="font-size: 95%; width: 100%;"
|-
! colspan="2" style="background:#6495ED;color:white;"|2019 Atlanta Dream Roster
|- style="text-align:center; background-color:#FF0000; color:#FFFFFF;"
! Players !! Coaches
|- 
| valign="top" |
{| class="sortable" style="background:transparent; margin:0px; width:100%;"
! Pos. !! # !! Nat. !! Name !! Ht. !! Wt. !! From
|-

Depth

Schedule

Preseason

|- style="background:#bbffbb;"
| 1
| May 13
| vs. Dallas
| W 82–59
| Bentley (15)
| Gülich (6)
| Tied (5)
| Mohegan Sun Arena3,300
| 1–0
|- style="background:#bbffbb;"
| 2
| May 14
| vs. New York
| W 87–92
| Coffey (18)
| McGee-Stafford (6)
| Tied (4)
| Mohegan Sun Arena3,458
| 2–0
|- bgcolor="ffcccc"
| 3
| May 17
| Washington
| L 64–75
| Hayes (17)
| Billings (6)
| Montgomery (4)
| Albany Civic CenterN/A
| 2–1

Regular season

|- style="background:#bbffbb;"
| 1
| May 24
| Dallas
| W 76–72
| Breland (17)
| Tied (6)
| Sykes (4)
| State Farm Arena3,070
| 1–0
|- style="background:#fcc;"
| 2
| May 31
| Seattle
| L 66–82
| Sykes (12)
| 3 tied (8)
| Bentley (4)
| State Farm Arena2,119
| 1–1

|- style="background:#fcc;"
| 3
| June 1
| @ Washington
| L 75–96
| Tied (11)
| Breland (7)
| Bentley (4)
| St. Elizabeth's East Arena4,200
| 1–2
|- style="background:#fcc;"
| 4
| June 6
| Las Vegas
| L 69–92
| Sykes (15)
| Breland (9)
| Montgomery (5)
| State Farm Arena2,630
| 1–3
|- bgcolor="ffcccc"
| 5
| June 9
| Connecticut
| L 59–65
| Tied (14)
| Billings (10)
| Tied (3)
| State Farm Arena3,082
| 1–4
|- style="background:#fcc;"
| 6
| June 15
| @ Dallas
| L 61–71
| Williams (16)
| Williams (8)
| Hayes (3)
| College Park Center5,220
| 1–5
|- style="background:#bbffbb;"
| 7
| June 19
| Indiana
| W 88–78
| Hayes (28)
| Billings (8)
| Montgomery (9)
| State Farm Arena6,474
| 2–5
|- style="background:#fcc;"
| 8
| June 21
| @ Connecticut
| L 76–86
| Sykes (18)
| Breland (8)
| Hayes (6)
| Mohegan Sun Arena6,608
| 2–6
|- style="background:#fcc;"
| 9
| June 23
| Washington
| L 73–89
| Hayes (18)
| Billings (14)
| Cazorla (6)
| State Farm Arena4,136
| 2–7
|- style="background:#fcc;"
| 10
| June 30
| New York
| L 58–74
| Sykes (18)
| Williams (8)
| Tied (4)
| State Farm Arena4,359
| 2–8

|- style="background:#fcc;"
| 11
| July 2
| @ Minnesota
| L 68–85
| Williams (14)
| Breland (5)
| Bentley (5)
| Target Center8,208
| 2–9
|- style="background:#bbffbb;"
| 12
| July 5
| @ Seattle
| W 77–66
| Hayes (21)
| Williams (9)
| Tied (5)
| Alaska Airlines Arena8,111
| 3–9
|- style="background:#fcc;"
| 13
| July 7
| @ Phoenix
| L 63–65
| Sykes (29)
| Sykes (10)
| 3 tied (3)
| Talking Stick Resort Arena9,850
| 3–10
|- style="background:#bbffbb;"
| 14
| July 10
| Connecticut
| W 78–75
| Hayes (18)
| Breland (13)
| Tied (4)
| State Farm Arena3,866
| 4–10
|- style="background:#bbffbb;"
| 15
| July 12
| Minnesota
| W 60–53
| Williams (17)
| Breland (9)
| Hayes (4)
| State Farm Arena4,001
| 5–10
|- style="background:#fcc;"
| 16
| July 14
| Los Angeles
| L 71–76 (OT)
| Hayes (24)
| Billings (16)
| Hayes (4)
| State Farm Arena5,083
| 5–11
|- style="background:#fcc;"
| 17
| July 17
| @ Chicago
| L 76–77
| Montgomery (23)
| Breland (11)
| Tied (6)
| Wintrust Arena10,143
| 5–12
|- style="background:#fcc;"
| 18
| July 19
| @ Connecticut
| L 69–98
| Sykes (26)
| Coffey (7)
| Sykes (4)
| Mohegan Sun Arena6,733
| 5–13
|- style="background:#fcc;"
| 19
| July 21
| @ Washington
| L 65–93
| Williams (14)
| Gülich (8)
| Cazorla (4)
| St. Elizabeth's East Arena4,200
| 5–14
|- style="background:#fcc;"
| 20
| July 23
| Los Angeles
| L 66–78
| Billings (16)
| Tied (8)
| Bentley (5)
| State Farm Arena7,047
| 5–15
|- style="background:#fcc;"
| 21
| July 31
| @ Indiana
| L 59–61
| Williams (17)
| Billings (12)
| Breland (4)
| Bankers Life Fieldhouse5,702
| 5–16

|- style="background:#fcc;"
| 22
| August 3
| Chicago
| L 75–87
| Bentley (21)
| Breland (7)
| Hayes (4)
| State Farm Arena5,427
| 5–17
|- style="background:#fcc;"
| 23
| August 6
| Minnesota
| L 69–85
| Montgomery (19)
| Sykes (8)
| Tied (3)
| State Farm Arena3,395
| 5–18
|- style="background:#fcc;"
| 24
| August 10
| @ Indiana
| L 82–87
| Hayes (34)
| Sykes (9)
| Sykes (5)
| Bankers Life Fieldhouse7,923
| 5–19
|- style="background:#fcc;"
| 25
| August 13
| @ Las Vegas
| L 90–94
| Breland (18)
| Gülich (12)
| Bentley (7)
| Mandalay Bay Events Center3,532
| 5–20
|- style="background:#fcc;"
| 26
| August 16
| @ Phoenix
| L 68–77
| Montgomery (17)
| Williams (11)
| Williams (4)
| Talking Stick Resort Arena8,480
| 5–21
|- style="background:#fcc;"
| 27
| August 20
| Chicago
| L 83–87
| Hayes (27)
| Billings (9)
| Bentley (5)
| State Farm Arena4,662
| 5–22
|- style="background:#bbffbb;"
| 28
| August 23
| @ New York
| W 90–87
| Hayes (19)
| Breland (12)
| Sykes (6)
| Westchester County Center1,831
| 6–22
|- style="background:#bbffbb;"
| 29
| August 25
| @ Dallas
| W 77–73
| Hayes (23)
| Breland (12)
| Bentley (4)
| College Park Center4,715
| 7–22
|- style="background:#fcc;"
| 30
| August 29
| Phoenix
| L 58–65
| Montgomery (20)
| Breland (11)
| 3 tied (3)
| State Farm Arena3,727
| 7–23

|- style="background:#fcc;"
| 31
| September 1
| @ Seattle
| L 75–92
| Tied (15)
| Williams (6)
| Bentley (5)
| Alaska Airlines Arena9,000
| 7–24
|- style="background:#fcc;"
| 32
| September 3
| @ Los Angeles
| L 60–70
| Tied (15)
| Billings (10)
| Montgomery (4)
| Staples Center9,889
| 7–25
|- style="background:#bbffbb;"
| 33
| September 5
| Las Vegas
| W 78–74
| Williams (20)
| Billings (14)
| Bentley (8)
| State Farm Arena4,023
| 8–25
|- style="background:#fcc;"
| 34
| September 8
| New York
| L 63–71
| Bentley (17)
| Breland (12)
| Breland (4)
| State Farm Arena5,495
| 8–26

Standings

Statistics

Regular Season

References

External links
THE OFFICIAL SITE OF THE ATLANTA DREAM

Atlanta Dream seasons
Atlanta
Atlanta Dream